A post-common envelope binary (PCEB) or pre-cataclysmic variable is a binary system consisting of a white dwarf or hot subdwarf and a main-sequence star or a brown dwarf. The star or brown dwarf shared a common envelope with the white dwarf progenitor in the red giant phase. In this scenario the star or brown dwarf loses angular momentum as it orbits within the envelope, eventually leaving a main-sequence star and white dwarf in a short-period orbit. A PCEB will continue to lose angular momentum via magnetic braking and gravitational waves and will eventually begin mass-transfer, resulting in a cataclysmic variable. While there are thousands of PCEBs known, there are only a few eclipsing PCEBs, also called ePCEBs. Even more rare are PCEBs with a brown dwarf as the secondary. A brown dwarf with a mass lower than 20  might evaporate during the common envelope phase and therefore the secondary is supposed to have a mass higher than 20 .

The material ejected from the common envelope forms a planetary nebula. One in five planetary nebulae are ejected from common envelopes, but this might be an underestimate. A planetary nebula formed by a common envelope system usually shows a bipolar structure.

The suspected PCEB HD 101584 is surrounded by a complex nebula. During the common envelope phase the red giant phase of the primary was terminated prematurely, avoiding a stellar merger. The remaining  hydrogen envelope of HD 101584 was ejected during the interaction between the red giant and the companion and it now forms the circumstellar medium around the binary.

Many eclipsing post-common envelope binaries show variations in the timing of eclipses, the cause of which is uncertain. While orbiting exoplanets are often proposed as the cause of these variations, planetary models often fail to predict subsequent changes in eclipse timing. Other proposed causes, such as the Applegate mechanism, often cannot fully explain the observed eclipse timing variations either.

List of post-common envelope binaries 
Sorted by increasing orbital period.

See also
 Cataclysmic variable

References

Binary stars
White dwarfs
Stellar phenomena